Ram Singh I was the elder son of Jai Singh I and was the ruler of Amber (now part of the Jaipur Municipal Corporation), and head of the Kachwaha Rajput clan.
He was also subehdar of Kashmir.

He was commissioned by the Mughal Emperor Aurangzeb in 1667 to invade the Ahom kingdom of present-day Assam, but the loss at the ultimate Battle of Saraighat and the subsequent retreat led to his recall and disgrace.

Chatrapati Shivaji Maharaj and Ram Singh 
When Chatrapati Shivaji Maharaj went to Agra in the Mughal court, on 12 May 1666, he was made to stand alongside relatively low-ranking nobles, Chatrapati Shivaji Maharaj took offence and stormed out of court and was promptly placed under house arrest. Ram Singh was granted custody of Chatrapati Shivaji Maharaj and his son.

Chatrapati Shivaji Maharaj's house arrest situation was precarious. Aurangzeb's court deliberated whether to execute him or keep him as a servant. Jai Singh, having assured Chatrapati Shivaji Maharaj of his personal safety, tried to influence Aurangzeb's decision. However, Aurangzeb intended to kill Chatrapati Shivaji Maharaj and ordered Faulad Khan to transfer Chatrapati Shivaji Maharaj from Ram Singh's custody to Radanaza Khan's house. Kunwar Ram Singh refused to deliver over Chatrapati Shivaji Maharaj because his father, Jai Singh, had promised Chatrapati Shivaji Maharaj's safety and that he should be slain first to kill Chatrapati Shivaji Maharaj. Aurangzeb made him to sign security bond for Chatrapati Shivaji Maharaj. 

Chatrapati Shivaji Maharaj devised a strategy for emancipation. He ordered the majority of his troops home and urged Ram Singh to withdraw his pledges to the emperor for the safe custody of himself and his son. Shivaji escaped and left Agra on August 17, 1666, by putting himself in one of the enormous baskets and his son Sambhaji in another.

After Chatrapati Shivaji Maharaj's escape, Ram Singh was accused of assisting Shivaji's escape and was punished, first by being barred from entering court and subsequently by being demoted.

Ahom Campaign 
Ram Singh was forced to fight Ahom force with 21 Rajput chiefs, own paid 4,000 soldiers, 1,500 ahadis, 500 artillerymen, and with the reinforcements from Bengal, numbers totalled upto 30,000 infantry, 18,000 turkish cavalry, and 15,000 Koch archers. Ram Singh was eventually defeated and with his troops further reduced he could only helplessly retreat until the governor of Bengal sent some troops to aid him. Ram Singh grew sick of war and finally, in 1676 he was allowed to leave and return to his province. He was later posted in Kohat where he died in 1688.

See also
 House of Kachwaha
 Mughal Empire
 Ahom-Mughal conflicts
 Battle of Saraighat

Notes

References

 Sarkar Jadunath (1984, reprint 1994). A History of Jaipur, New Delhi: Orient Longman, .
 

1688 deaths
Maharajas of Jaipur
17th-century Indian monarchs
Year of birth unknown